A list of films produced in Italy in 2002 (see 2002 in film):

See also
2002 in Italy
2002 in Italian television

External links
Italian films of 2002 at the Internet Movie Database

2002
Films
Italian